Margaret Johnson (15 June 1937 – 24 February 2015) was an Australian athlete. She competed in the women's long jump at the 1956 Summer Olympics.

References

1937 births
2015 deaths
Athletes (track and field) at the 1956 Summer Olympics
Australian female long jumpers
Olympic athletes of Australia
Place of birth missing